Title 25 is the portion of the Code of Federal Regulations that governs Government-to-Government relations with Native American tribes within the United States.  It is available in digital or printed form.

External links
 Title 25 of the Code of Federal Regulations

 
 25